The murder of East Moline, Illinois, teenager Adrianne Leigh Reynolds made national headlines. She was beaten, strangled, burned, and dismembered by her classmates Sarah Anne Kolb and Cory Gregory on January 21, 2005.

People involved

Victim
Adrianne Reynolds was originally from Kilgore, Texas. She moved to East Moline, Illinois, when she was 16 to live with her adoptive father and stepmother, Tony and Joann Reynolds. She began attending Black Hawk College Outreach Center in November 2004 to earn her GED so she could realize her dream of joining the Marines. While there, she met fellow students Sarah Kolb and Cory Gregory.

Perpetrators
Sarah Kolb was reportedly a popular girl at the Outreach Center.  She lived with her mother and stepfather in the nearby town of Milan, Illinois. When Adrianne started in the school, she befriended Sarah's former boyfriend and current best friend Cory Gregory.
Cory Gregory was also a Juggalo, and originally attended Moline High School but later transferred to the Outreach Center, where he met Sarah. He lived with his mother at the time of the incident. In January 2005, Adrianne reportedly asked Cory out, which allegedly angered Sarah.

Murder
On the afternoon of January 21, 2005, Sarah invited Adrianne to join her, Cory, and another friend Sean McKitrick for lunch at Taco Bell; When they arrived there, Sarah and Adrianne reportedly began fighting, Sean told Sarah to stop but she told him if he didn't like it then he should leave, and he immediately left. In the parking lot of Taco Bell, Cory held down Adrianne while Sarah strangled her with a belt.

After the murder, Sarah and Cory took Adrianne's body to Sarah's grandparents' farm in Aledo, Illinois, where they tried to burn it  with gasoline. When it failed to burn after several hours, they recruited Nathan Gaudet, a 16-year-old boy from Moline, to help dismember the body. Nathan used his grandfather's handsaw to remove Adrianne's head and arms and placed them in a garbage bag. The three teenagers ate lunch at McDonald's, then later disposed of the garbage bag at the Black Hawk State Historic Site.

Adrianne's parents reported her missing after she failed to show up to work at a nearby Checkers restaurant. Authorities were led to Adrianne's remains a few days later on January 26, 2005, by Cory Gregory.

Arrests and trials
Sarah Kolb and Cory Gregory were both charged with two counts of first-degree murder and concealment of a homicide on February 1, 2005; they both pleaded not guilty.

Sarah was the first to go to trial, which began on October 31, 2005, at the Rock Island County Courthouse. After two weeks of trial and 15 hours of deliberation, the trial jury was unable to reach a unanimous verdict on any of the three charges. The hung jury resulted in a mistrial. One juror opted for acquittal, while eleven were in favor of conviction.

At her retrial on February 6, 2006, in Dixon, Illinois, Sarah was convicted on all counts. At her sentencing a few months later, she was sentenced to 48 years in prison for murder and 5 years for concealment. These sentences were to be served consecutively, for a total of 53 years incarcerated. She is serving her sentence at the Logan Correctional Center.

In the meantime, Cory Gregory pleaded guilty to all charges against him. On July 10, 2006, he was sentenced to 40 years in prison for murder and 5 years for concealment, resulting in a 45-year prison term. He is serving his sentence at the Stateville Correctional Center.

Nathan Gaudet was also charged with concealment for helping to dismember Adrianne. He pleaded guilty and was given a juvenile sentence of five years. He was released from juvenile detention on November 11, 2008, after serving almost four years.  On April 16, 2012, he died in an automobile crash in Indiana.

Media coverage
This case has been discussed or portrayed on Dateline NBC in October 2006; Deadly Women in December 2010; E! Investigates in June 2011; Snapped in September 2011, and I Killed My BFF on LMN in August 2013. On November 9, 2020, the podcast “Court Junkie” released an hour long episode detailing the case. Discussed on November 28, 2018, on Morbid: a True Crime Podcast.  Released March 2, 2022, it was featured on Crimes of Passion podcast, Sarah Kolb and Harli Quinn.

References 

1988 births
2005 deaths
2005 in Illinois
2005 murders in the United States
Deaths by person in Illinois
Deaths by strangulation in the United States
Deaths by beating in the United States
January 2005 events in the United States
Murder committed by minors
2006 in Illinois